Kaash is a 2015 Indian Hindi-language drama film written and directed by Ishaan Nair. Produced by Irrfan Khan, it features Nidhi Sunil, Kavya Trehan, and Varun Mitra in pivotal roles. Actress Kalki Koechlin makes cameo appearance as a French born hippie in the film. The film premiered at the 2014 Tokyo film festival.

Plot 

Frustrated with his dwindling relationship, Aadil, a dreamy young photographer, spontaneously sets off to meet a girl he has connected with over the vast universe of the Internet. Far from the urban dystopia of Bombay he falls into Khushali's simple world of earthly delights. In her, he finds strains of Samira, as she was and as she has become.

Cast 
 Nidhi Sunil as Samira
 Kavya Trehan as Khushali
 Varun Mitra as Adil
 Kalki Koechlin (cameo)

References

External links 

2015 films
2010s Hindi-language films
Indian drama films